The 1934 Norwegian Football Cup was the 33rd season of the Norwegian annual knockout football tournament. The tournament was open for all members of NFF, except those from Northern Norway. The final was played at Sorgenfri gressbane in Trondheim on 14 October 1934, and was contested by the defending champions Mjøndalen and the two-time former winners Sarpsborg. Mjøndalen successfully defended their title with a 2–1 victory after extra time, securing their second Norwegian Cup trophy.

Rounds and dates
 First round: 5 August
 Second round: 12 August
 Third round: 26 August
 Fourth round: 9 September
 Quarter-finals: 16 September
 Semi-finals: 30 September
 Final: 14 October

First round

|-
|colspan="3" style="background-color:#97DEFF"|Replay

|}

Second round

|-
|colspan="3" style="background-color:#97DEFF"|Replay

|}

Third round 

|-
|colspan="3" style="background-color:#97DEFF"|Replay

|}

Fourth round

{{OneLegResult|Lyn||3–3 |Lisleby'}}

|-
|colspan="3" style="background-color:#97DEFF"|Replay|-
|colspan="3" style="background-color:#97DEFF"|2nd replay|-
|colspan="3" style="background-color:#97DEFF"|3rd replay''

|}

Quarter-finals

|}

Semi-finals

|}

Final

See also
1934 in Norwegian football

References

Norwegian Football Cup seasons
Norway
Cup